The 1943–44 Kansas Jayhawks men's basketball team represented the University of Kansas during the 1943–44 college men's basketball season.

Roster
George Dick
Willard Frank
Gordon Stucker
Dean Corder
Harold McSpadden
Charles Moffett
Homer Sherwood
Louis Goehring
Robert Turner
William Lindquist
Robert Malott
Donald Diehl
Donald Barrington

Schedule

References

Kansas Jayhawks men's basketball seasons
Kansas
Kansas
Kansas